The Assam Valley Literary Award was conceived in the year 1990 by Williamson Magor Education Trust to honour creative writers who have enhanced Assamese literature.

It is given to writers of Assam once a year.  The award was instituted by the Williamson Magor Group, a tea company.

History
The award was announced by Shri B.M. Khaitan, Chairman, Williamson Magor Group of Industries, Tea major at the foundation stone laying ceremony of the Assam Valley School on 11 February 1990, at Harchurah in Sonitpur district of Assam.

The award comprises cash award, a scroll of honour made of Assam "Muga" silk and a specially designed golden trophy. This trophy has been designed by the artist of Assam, Shri Shobha Brahma.

Award winners

Year                 Winner
1990                 Bhabendra Nath Saikia
1991                 Homen Borgohain
1992                 Syed Abdul Malik
1993                 Nabakanta Barua
1994                 Jogesh Das
1995                 Saurabh Kumar Chaliha
1996                 Umakanta Sharma
1997                 Nilamani Phookan
1998                 Mahim Bora
1999                 Ajit Barua
2000                 Hiren Bhattacharya
2001                 Sheelabhadra (Rebati Mohan Dutta Choudhury) 
2002                 Chandra Prasad Saikia
2003                 Nirupama Borgohain
2004                 Lakshmi Nandan Bora
2005                 Arun Sharma (dramatist)
2006                 Nalinidhar Bhattacharya
2007                 Nagen Saikia
2008                 Rongbong Terang
 2009                Imran Shah
 2010  Harekrishna Deka
 2011                Purobi Bormudoi
 2012                Sameer Tanti
 2013                 Atulananda Goswami
 2014                 Hirendra Nath Dutta 
 2015 Apurba Sharma
 2016 Dr. Arupa Kalita Patangia
 2017 Sananta Tanty, Yeshe Dorjee Thongchi, Dr. Rita Chowdhury

References

Indian literary awards
Civil awards and decorations of Assam
Assamese literature
Awards established in 1990